Maijdee is a city and district headquarter of Noakhali District, located in  south eastern Bangladesh. It is the administrative center and the main city of Noakhali District in Chattogram Division, Bangladesh. It is also known as Maijdee City. It consists of 9 wards and 36 mahallas. It has an area of 23.79 km2.

Noakhali Dhannapur Madrasha
The ancient name of Noakhali city was Sudharam. Sudharam on the west bank of the Noakhali khal about two miles from the sea was the headquarters of the district. In 1821, it was chosen as the headquarters of the Joint Magistrate appointed to the charge of the district of Bhulua. Sudharam was named from Sudliaram Mazumdar, a wealthy merchant and benefactor, who excavated the large tank known by his name.
In 1876, it was constituted a Municipality and the population in 1901 was about 6,520. It was really nothing but a rural bazaar with a few Government offices and residential buildings. It was completely wrecked by the cyclone of 1893, and the Government offices erected since
then are fine substantial buildings. There is a neat little Town Hall with a stage, billiard room, and library attached to it, and a good Circuit House has been built lately. The drinking water was supplied from Sudharam's tank. The town is connected by railway with Laksam, and steamers run from it to the islands and to Barisal.

In 1948, when the district headquarters were extinct by the erosion of the Meghna River, it was shifted 8 km to the north to its present place at Maijdee.

Population
The city has a population of 130,842 (male 51.50%, female 48.50%). Population density is 5915 per km2.

Education
Literacy rate among the town people is 69.5%.

References

External links
 Noakhali.gov.bd

Populated places in Noakhali District